Athous tauricola is a species of brown-coloured click beetle from the family Elateridae which can be found on the Crimean peninsula and Ukraine.

References

Beetles described in 1905
Beetles of Europe